John Crichton "Jack" Green-Armytage (February 11, 1872 – August 7, 1943) was a Canadian ice hockey rover. Born in Fergus, Ontario, Canada, he is best remembered as the man who first organized a hockey club in the city of Winnipeg, Manitoba, Canada.

Awards and achievements
Stanley Cup Championships – 1896 with the Winnipeg Victorias
"Honoured Member" of the Manitoba Hockey Hall of Fame

References
Jack Armytage’s biography at Manitoba Hockey Hall of Fame

Notes

Canadian ice hockey forwards
Ice hockey people from Ontario
Stanley Cup champions
Winnipeg Victorias players
People from Centre Wellington
1872 births
1943 deaths